Mata'afa George Keenan (born Rarotonga, 26 October 1960) is a Cook Islands-born Samoan former rugby union player. He played as a lock.

Career
Keenan debuted in the 1991 Rugby World Cup roster in the match against Wales, at Cardiff on 6 October 1991. His last international match was against Australia at Sydney, on 6 August 1994.

Notes

References
Mat Keenan International Statistics
Mata'afa G. Keenan International Statistics

1960 births
Living people
Cook Island sportspeople
Samoan rugby union players
Rugby union locks
Samoa international rugby union players
Irish Exiles rugby union players
University of Auckland alumni